Gonzalo Anes Álvarez de Castrillón (10 December 1931 – 31 March 2014) was a Spanish economist, professor and historian. He was director of the Royal Academy of History.

He was born in Trelles, Coaña, Asturias, and died on 31 March 2014 in Madrid.

Honours
He was a winner of the King Juan Carlos Prize in Economics.
In recognition of his work, he was made Marquis of Castrillón, a title he held from 2010 until his death in 2014.

References

Other websites
 Gonzalo Anes at the Royal Academy of History

1931 births
2014 deaths
Spanish economists
Members of the Real Academia de la Historia
20th-century Spanish historians
People from Asturias